Cuxhaven BasCats was a professional basketball club based in Cuxhaven, Germany. The BasCats play in the ProA, the second tier professional league in Germany. 

In 2015, the club was declared bankrupt and its license was handed over to Rot-Weiss, another team based in Cuxhaven.

Season by season

Players

Individual awards
ProA Player of the Year
 Roderick Trice – 2008

Notable players

External links
 Official website 

BasCats
Defunct basketball teams in Germany
Basketball teams established in 2004
Basketball teams disestablished in 2015